The Cetatea de Baltă gas field is a natural gas field located in Cetatea de Baltă, Alba County. It was discovered in 1900 and developed by and Romgaz. It began production in 1910 and produces natural gas and condensates. The total proven reserves of the Cetatea de Baltă gas field are around 1.42 trillion cubic feet (40 km³), and production is slated to be around 35 million cubic feet/day (1×105m³) in 2010.

References

Natural gas fields in Romania